Andreea Enescu (née Tâlvâc; born 4 October 1981) is a Romanian female handballer who plays for CSM Unirea Slobozia.

Individual awards 
 Liga Națională Top Scorer: 2015

References
 

1981 births
Living people
Sportspeople from Sibiu
Romanian female handball players
SCM Râmnicu Vâlcea (handball) players